In mathematics, the Hadamard product may refer to:
 Hadamard product of two matrices, the matrix such that each entry is the product of the corresponding entries of the input matrices
 Hadamard product of two power series, the power series whose coefficients are the product of the corresponding coefficients of the input series
 a way of expressing an entire function of finite order
 an infinite product expansion for the Riemann zeta function